De Nog Grotere Slijmfilm: Het Geheim van Octoslijm is a 2021 Dutch film directed by Martijn Smits. The film is the sequel to the 2020 film De Grote Slijmfilm directed by Hans Somers.

The film won the Golden Film award after having sold 100,000 tickets. The film finished in 14th place in the list of best visited films in the Netherlands in 2021 with just over 247,000 visitors.

In February 2022, the sequel De Allergrootste Slijmfilm was announced.

References

External links 
 

2021 films
Dutch adventure films
Dutch children's films
2020s Dutch-language films
Films directed by Martijn Smits
Dutch sequel films